The  Denver Broncos season was the team's 26th year in professional football and its 16th with the National Football League (NFL). Despite finishing with an impressive record of eleven wins and five losses, the Broncos failed to make the playoffs. The Broncos were coming off a loss to the Steelers in the divisional round, and were picked by many to make the Super Bowl at the end of the 1985 season. The Broncos would start out well, as they started 6-2 and 8-3. However, two losses in overtime to arch rival Los Angeles resulted in the Broncos needing to win their final two games of the season to try to sneak into the playoffs. They did just that, beating Kansas City 14-13 and Seattle 27-24. However, even though the Broncos finished 11-5, they failed to reach the playoffs by virtue of a tiebreaker with the New England Patriots. The tiebreaker was based on the teams' common opponents record; and the Patriots beat the Broncos in that category by finishing 4-2 against the Raiders, Seahawks, Dolphins, and Colts, while the Broncos finished just 3-3 against the same four teams. The 1985 Broncos are one of two teams in NFL history since the 1970 merger to end the season with eleven or more wins and not qualify for the playoffs - the other is the 2008 Patriots.

Off Season

NFL draft

Personnel

Staff

Roster

Regular season

Schedule

Season summary

Week 11

Week 14 vs Raiders

Standings

References

External links
 1985 Denver Broncos at Pro-Football-Reference.com

Denver Broncos
Denver Broncos seasons
Denver Bronco